San Micheletto is a Baroque- style, now-deconsecrated Roman Catholic church located on a street of the same name in Lucca, region of Tuscany, Italy.

History
A church at the site was present since the 8th century, but the present 12th-century church was attached in the 15th century to a Clarissan monastery.

Further reconstruction occurred in the 18th century, a few Romanesque touches remain. In 2015, the convent houses the Fondazione Ragghianti, with its photographic and media archives and library.

References

Roman Catholic churches in Lucca
Baroque architecture in Lucca
12th-century Roman Catholic church buildings in Italy
17th-century Roman Catholic church buildings in Italy